Graham Lloyd Stokoe (born 17 December 1975) is an English former footballer who played in the Football League for Hartlepool United and Stoke City.

Career
Stokoe was born in Newcastle-upon-Tyne and began his career with Newcastle United before joining Stoke City in 1995. He struggled to settle in the area and moved back up north to Hartlepool United where he played eight matches in 1995–96. He made two substitute appearances for Stoke in 1996–97 both away at Portsmouth and then Huddersfield Town. He left in 1998 and made a return to Hartlepool United playing 23 matches for Mick Tait's side in 1998–99. He later played for non-league Blyth Spartans.

Career statistics
Source:

A.  The "Other" column constitutes appearances and goals in the Football League Trophy.

References

English footballers
Stoke City F.C. players
Hartlepool United F.C. players
English Football League players
1975 births
Living people
Blyth Spartans A.F.C. players
Association football midfielders